Działyń  is a village in the administrative district of Gmina Zbójno, within Golub-Dobrzyń County, Kuyavian-Pomeranian Voivodeship, in north-central Poland.

The village has a population of 860.

References

Villages in Golub-Dobrzyń County